Ovraqin (also Romanized as Ovraqīn; also known as Auwarghon, Oorghīn, Orqīn, and Ūrqīn) is a village in Raheb Rural District, in the Central District of Kabudarahang County, Hamadan Province, Iran. At the 2006 census, its population was 1,849, in 402 families.

References 

Populated places in Kabudarahang County